Reginald Alexander O. "Rex" Norris (18 July 1899 – September 1980) was an Indian field hockey player who competed in the 1928 Summer Olympics. Norris was born in an Anglo-Indian family from Jabalpur in the central provinces of British India. In 1928, he was a member of the Indian field hockey team, which won the gold medal.

Norris later became an international field hockey coach based in London. He coached the Dutch field hockey team from 1954 to 1956, the Italian team in 1960 and the Mexican team before the 1968 Olympics. Norris's son Ron represented India as a light welterweight in the 1952 Helsinki Olympics. Norris's daughters, Philomena and Wendy, also represented India in field hockey.

References

External links
 

1899 births
1980 deaths
Field hockey players from Madhya Pradesh
Olympic field hockey players of India
Field hockey players at the 1928 Summer Olympics
Indian male field hockey players
Olympic gold medalists for India
Anglo-Indian people
Olympic medalists in field hockey
Medalists at the 1928 Summer Olympics
Indian emigrants to England
British people of Anglo-Indian descent